The 1986 Vuelta a Murcia was the second edition of the Vuelta a Murcia cycle race and was held on 25 February to 2 March 1986. The race started in Cartagena and finished in Murcia. The race was won by Miguel Induráin.

General classification

References

1986
1986 in road cycling
1986 in Spanish sport